Good Hands Records is an independent hip hop record label founded in 2002 by DJ Truth aka Charley Greenberg and Art Beeswax aka Larry Maley. In 2006, Good Hands secured a distribution deal with Traffic Entertainment Group and released Camp Lo's "Black Hollywood", Kurupt Presents Tangled Thoughts, "Philly 2 Cali", Killah Priest's "The Offering", Charon Don and DJ Huggy's (Hands Down), "Art of Life", and Dev Rocka's "The Night Shift" in 2007.

In 2008, Good Hands re-signed Wu Tang affiliate Killah Priest, and released the follow-up to "The Offering", "Behind The Stained Glass." Good Hands also released "Operation: Take Back Hip Hop" from Juice Crew legends Craig G & Marley Marl, as well as the Killah Priest & Chief Kamachi collaboration album "Beautiful Minds."

In September 2008, Good Hands announced a joint venture with artist Lil Scrappy's new label G'$ Up Records.  Lil Scrappy & G'$ Up "Silence and Secrecy: Black Rag Gang" was released on February 24, 2009.

Good Hands earlier releases, via a joint venture with Eastern Conference Records, include Chief Kamachi's "Cult Status", Chief Kamachi and the Juju Mob's "Black Candles", and Reef The Lost Cauze's "Feast or Famine."

External links
More News From Good Hands - UGHH.com 
Good Hands signs Killah Priest 
Good Hands Records on Myspace

American record labels
Hip hop record labels